Small modular reactors (SMRs) are a proposed class of nuclear fission reactors, smaller than conventional nuclear reactors, which can be built in one location (such as a factory), then shipped, commissioned, and operated at a separate site. The term SMR refers to the size, capacity and modular construction only, not to the reactor type and the nuclear process which is applied. Designs range from scaled down versions of existing designs to generation IV designs. Both thermal-neutron reactors and fast-neutron reactors have been proposed, along with molten salt and gas cooled reactor models.

SMRs are typically anticipated to have an electrical power output of less than 300 MWe (electric) or less than 1000 MWth (thermal). Many SMR proposals rely on a manufacturing-centric model, requiring many deployments to secure economies of unit production large enough to achieve economic viability.  Some SMR designs, typically those using Generation IV technologies, aim to secure additional economic advantage through improvements in electrical generating efficiency from much higher temperature steam generation. Ideally, modular reactors will reduce on-site construction, increase containment efficiency, and are claimed to enhance safety. The greater safety should come via the use of passive safety features that operate without human intervention, a concept already implemented in some conventional nuclear reactor types. SMRs should also reduce staffing versus conventional nuclear reactors, and are claimed to have the ability to bypass financial and safety barriers that inhibit the construction of conventional reactors.

As of 2023, there are more than eighty modular reactor designs and yet unfinished demonstration projects, and the first SMR units are in operation in Russia and China. The floating nuclear power plant Akademik Lomonosov (operating in Pevek in Russia's Far East) is, as of October 2022, the first operating prototype in the world. The first unit of China’s pebble-bed modular high-temperature gas-cooled reactor HTR-PM was connected to the grid in 2021.

SMRs differ in terms of staffing, security and deployment time. US government studies to evaluate SMR-associated risks have slowed licensing. One concern with SMRs is preventing nuclear proliferation.

Background 
Economic factors of scale mean that nuclear reactors tend to be large, to such an extent that size itself becomes a limiting factor. The 1986 Chernobyl disaster and the 2011 Fukushima nuclear disaster caused a major set-back for the nuclear industry, with worldwide suspension of development, cutting down of funding, and closure of reactor plants.

In response, a new strategy was introduced aiming at building smaller reactors, which are faster to realize, safer, and at lower cost for a single reactor. Despite the loss of scale advantages and considerably less power output, funding was expected to be easier thanks to the introduction of modular construction and projects with expected shorter timescales. The generic SMR proposal is to swap the economies of unit scale for the economies of unit mass production.

Proponents claim that SMRs are less expensive due to the use of standardized modules that can be produced off-site. SMRs do, however, also have some economic disadvantages. Several studies suggest that the overall costs of SMRs are comparable with those of conventional large reactors. Moreover, extremely
limited information about SMR modules transportation has been published. Critics say that modular building will only be cost-effective at high quantities of the same types, given the still remaining high costs for each SMR. A high market share is needed to obtain sufficient orders.

Proponents say that nuclear energy with proven technology is safe; the nuclear industry contends that smaller size will make SMRs even safer than conventional plants. Critics say that more small reactors pose a higher risk, requiring more transportation of nuclear fuel and increased generation of waste. SMRs require new designs with new technology, the safety of which has yet to be proven.

Until 2020, no truly modular SMRs had been built. In May 2020, the first prototype of a floating nuclear power plant with two 30 MWe reactors  - the type KLT-40 - started operation in Pevek, Russia. This concept is based on the design of nuclear icebreakers. The operation of the first commercial land-based, 125 MWe demonstration reactor ACP100 (Linglong One) is due to start in China by the end of 2026.

General aspects

Licensing 
Once the first unit of a given design is licensed, licensing subsequent units should be drastically simpler, assuming that all units operate identically.

Scalability 
A future power station using SMRs can begin with a single module and expand by adding modules as demand grows. This reduces startup costs associated with conventional designs.

Some SMRs have a load-following design such that they can produce less electricity when demand is low.

Siting/infrastructure 
SMRs will require much less land, e.g., the 470 MWe 3-loop Rolls-Royce SMR reactor takes , 10% of that needed for a traditional plant. This unit is too large to meet the definition of a small modular reactor and will require more on-site construction, which calls into question the claimed benefits of SMRs. The firm is targeting a 500-day construction time.

Electricity needs in remote locations are usually small and variable, making them suitable for a smaller plant. The smaller size may also reduce the need for a grid to distribute their output.

Flexibility of SMR 
SMRs offer significant advantages over conventional style nuclear reactors due to the flexibility of their modular design. Flexibility in the capabilities of SMRs offers advantages, incremental load capacity, ability for adaptation to current nuclear powerplant sites, utilization for industrial applications, improved operating time, and the ability to be “grid independent”.

Safety 
Containment is more efficient, and proliferation concerns are much less.  For example, a pressure release valve may have a spring that can respond to increasing pressure to increase coolant flow. Inherent safety features require no moving parts to work, depending only on physical laws. Another example is a plug at the bottom of a reactor that melts away when temperatures are too high, allowing the reactor fuel to drain out of the reactor and lose critical mass.

A report by the German Federal Office for the Safety of Nuclear Waste Management (BASE) considering 136 different historical and current reactors and SMR concepts stated: "Overall, SMRs could potentially achieve safety advantages compared to power plants with a larger power output, as they have a lower radioactive inventory per reactor and aim for a higher safety level especially through simplifications and an increased use of passive systems. In contrast, however, various SMR concepts also favour reduced regulatory requirements, for example, with regard to the required degree of redundancy or diversity in safety systems. Some developers even demand that current requirements be waived, for example in the area of internal accident management or with reduced planning zones, or even a complete waiver of external emergency protection planning. Since the safety of a reactor plant depends on all of these factors, based on the current state of knowledge it is not possible to state, that a higher safety level is achieved by SMR concepts in principle."

Proliferation 
Many SMRs are designed to use unconventional fuels that allow for higher burnup and longer fuel cycles. Longer refueling intervals can decrease proliferation risks and lower chances of radiation escaping containment. For reactors in remote areas, accessibility can be troublesome, so longer fuel life can be helpful.

Designs

SMRs are envisioned in multiple designs. Some are simplified versions of current reactors, others involve entirely new technologies. All proposed SMRs use nuclear fission with designs including thermal-neutron reactors and fast-neutron reactors.

Thermal-neutron reactors 
Thermal-neutron reactors rely on a moderator to slow neutrons and generally use  as fissile material. Most conventional operating reactors are of this type.

Fast reactors 
Fast reactors don't use moderators. Instead they rely on the fuel to absorb higher speed neutrons. This usually means changing the fuel arrangement within the core, or using different fuels.

Fast reactors can be breeder reactors. These reactors release enough neutrons to transmute non-fissionable elements into fissionable ones. Once the  undergoes a neutron absorption reaction, it becomes , which can be removed from the reactor during refueling, and subsequently used as fuel.

Technologies

Cooling 
Conventional reactors typically use water as a coolant. SMRs may use water, liquid metal, gas and molten salt as coolants. Coolant type is determined based on the reactor type, reactor design, and the chosen application. Large-rated reactors primarily use light water as coolant, allowing for this cooling method to be easily applied to SMRs. Helium is often elected as a gas coolant for SMRs because it yields a high plant thermal efficiency and supplies a sufficient amount of reactor heat. Sodium, lead, and lead-bismuth are common liquid metal coolants of choice for SMRs. There was a large focus on sodium during early work on large-rated reactors which has since carried over to SMRs to be a prominent choice as a liquid metal coolant. SMRs have lower cooling water requirements, which expands the number of places a SMR could be built, including remote areas typically incorporating mining and desalination.

Thermal/electrical generation
Some gas-cooled reactor designs could drive a gas-powered turbine, rather than boiling water, such that thermal energy can be used directly. Heat could also be used in hydrogen production and other commercial operations, such as desalination and the production of petroleum products (extracting oil from oil sands, creating synthetic oil from coal, etc.).

Load following 
SMR designs are generally expected to provide base load power; some proposed designs can adjust their output based on demand.

Another approach, especially for SMRs that can provide high temperature heat, is to adopt cogeneration, maintaining consistent output, while diverting otherwise unneeded heat to an auxiliary use.  District heating, desalination and hydrogen production have been proposed as cogeneration options.

Overnight desalination requires sufficient freshwater storage to enable water to be delivered at times other than when it is produced. Membrane and thermal are the two principal categories of desalination technology. The membrane desalination process uses only electricity and is employed the most out of the two technologies. In the thermal process, the feed water stream is evaporated in different stages with continuous decreases in pressure between the stages. The thermal process primarily uses thermal energy and does not include the intermediate conversion of thermal power to electricity. Thermal desalination technology is further divided into two principal technologies: the Multi Stage Flash distillation (MSF) and the Multi Effect Desalination (MED).

Waste 
One study reported that some types of SMR could produce more waste per unit of output than conventional reactors, in some cases more than 5x the spent fuel per kilowatt, and as much as 35x other waste products, such as active steel. Neutron leakage rates were estimated to be higher for SMRs, because in smaller reactor cores, emitted neutrons have fewer chances to interact with the fuel. Instead, they exit the core, where they are absorbed by the shielding, turning it radioactive. Reactor designs that use liquid metal coolants also become radioactive. Another potential issue is that a lower fraction of the fuel is consumed, increasing waste volumes. The potentially increased diversity of reactors may require accordingly diverse waste management systems.

A report by the German Federal Office for the Safety of Nuclear Waste Management found that extensive interim storage and fuel transports would still be required for SMRs. A repository would still be required in any case.

Many SMR designs are fast reactors that have higher fuel burnup, reducing the amount of waste. At higher neutron energy more fission products can usually be tolerated. Breeder reactors "burn" , but convert fertile materials such as  into usable fuels.

Some reactor designs utilise the thorium fuel cycle, which offers significantly reduced long-term waste radiotoxicity compared to the uranium cycle.

The traveling wave reactor immediately uses fuel that it breeds without requiring the fuel's removal and cleaning.

Safety 
Some proposed SMRs use cooling systems that use thermoconvection – natural circulation – to eliminate cooling pumps that could break down. Convection can keep removing decay heat after reactor shutdown.

Negative temperature coefficients in the moderators and the fuels keep the fission reactions under control, causing the reaction to slow as temperature increases.

Some SMRs may need an active cooling system to back up the passive system, increasing cost. Additionally, SMR designs may have less need for containment structures.

Some SMR designs bury the reactor and spent-fuel storage pools underground.

Smaller reactors would be easier to upgrade.

SMRs maintain core cooling with a passive safety system which eliminates the need for pressure injection systems. With a passive safety system, emergency AC power sourced from a diesel generator is not required for core cooling. A passive safety system is simpler, requires less testing, and does not lead to inadvertent initiation. SMRs do not require an active containment heat system due to passive heat rejection out of containment and a containment spray system is not required. An emergency feedwater system is not necessary for SMRs, allowing for core heat removal and enhancing safety.

SMRs featuring water and sodium coolants increase reactor safety through their ability to withhold byproducts of the fissile fuel introduced into the coolants during a severe accident. This characteristic of a SMR allows for the ability of a SMR to mitigate the release of fissile material, contaminating the environment, in the event of a failure to maintain containment of nuclear material occurred.

Some SMR designs feature an integral design of which the primary reactor core, steam generator and the pressurizer are integrated within the sealed reactor vessel. This integrated design allows for the reduction of a possible accident as radiation leaks can easily be contained. In comparison to larger reactors having numerous components outside the reactor vessel, this feature drastically increases the safety by decreasing the chance of an uncontained accident. Furthermore, this feature allows many SMR designs bury the reactor and spent-fuel storage pools underground at the end of their service life therefore increasing the safety of waste disposal.

Flexibility of SMR 
Small nuclear reactors, in comparison to conventional nuclear power generation plants, offer many advantages due to the flexibility of their modular construction. This flexibility in the modularity of a SMR system allows for additional units to be incrementally added in the event load on the grid increases. Additionally, this flexibility in a standardized SMRs design revolving around modularity allows for rapid production at a decreasing cost following the completion of the first reactor on site.

The hypothesised flexibility and modularity of SMR allows additional power generation capability to be installed at existing power plants. Modularity of a SMR plant allows for “a single site can have three or four SMRs, allowing one to go off-line for refueling while the other reactors stay online”.

The flexibility of SMRs provides additional opportunities for industrial usage through saving energy lost through the transfer of energy from thermal to electrical. Applications for a SMR under these conditions of direct energy transfer include “desalination, industrial processes, hydrogen production, oil shale recovery, and district heating” of which a conventional large reactor is not capable.

Economics
A key driver of interest in SMRs is the claimed economies of scale in production, due to volume manufacture in an offsite factory. Some studies instead find the capital cost of SMRs to be equivalent to larger reactors. Substantial capital is needed to construct the factory - ameliorating that cost requires significant volume, estimated to be 40–70 units.

According to a 2014 study of electricity production in decentralized microgrids, the total cost of using SMRs for electricity generation would be significantly lower compared to the total cost of offshore wind, solar thermal, biomass, and solar photovoltaic electricity generation plants.

Construction costs per SMR reactor were claimed in 2016 to be less than that for a conventional nuclear plant, while exploitation costs may be higher for SMRs due to low scale economics and the higher number of reactors. SMR staff operating costs per unit output can be as much as 190% higher than the fixed operating cost of fewer large reactors. Modular building is a very complex process and there is "extremely limited information about SMR modules transportation", according to a 2019 report.

A production cost calculation done by the German Federal Office for the Safety of Nuclear Waste Management (BASE), taking into account economies of scale and learning effects from the nuclear industry, suggests that an average of 3,000 SMR would have to be produced before SMR production would be worthwhile. This is because the construction costs of SMRs are relatively higher than those of large nuclear power plants due to the low electrical output.

In 2017, an Energy Innovation Reform Project study of eight companies looked at reactor designs with capacity between 47.5 MWe and 1,648 MWe. The study reported average capital cost of $3,782/kW, average operating cost total of $21/MWh and levelized cost of electricity of $60/MWh.

In 2020, Energy Impact Center founder Bret Kugelmass claimed that thousands of SMRs could be built in parallel, "thus reducing costs associated with long borrowing times for prolonged construction schedules and reducing risk premiums currently linked to large projects." GE Hitachi Nuclear Energy Executive Vice President Jon Ball agreed, saying the modular elements of SMRs would also help reduce costs associated with extended construction times.

Estimated target electricity generation price is $89/MWh in 2023, increased from $58/MWh in 2021, for the first planned U.S. commercial deployment of SMRs at Idaho National Laboratory of six NuScale 77 MWh reactors. The project has $1.355 billion of U.S. government support plus an estimated $30/MWh generation subsidy from the 2020 Inflation Reduction Act.

Licensing
A major barrier to SMR adoption is the licensing process. It was developed for conventional, custom-built reactors, preventing the simple deployment of identical units at different sites. In particular, the US Nuclear Regulatory Commission process for licensing has focused mainly on conventional reactors. Design and safety specifications, staffing requirements and licensing fees have all been geared toward reactors with electrical output of more than 700MWe. With a sizable focus on large reactors, it is probable that many countries will have to adapt their policies to coincide with SMRs, which can be a costly and time-consuming process. The International Atomic Energy Agency has placed emphasis on creating a central licensing system for SMRs to ensure proper guidelines in the interest of overall public safety.

SMRs caused a reevaluation of the licensing process for nuclear reactors. One workshop in October 2009 and another in June 2010 considered the topic, followed by a Congressional hearing in May 2010. Multiple US agencies are working to define SMR licensing. However, some argue that weakening safety regulations to push the development of SMRs may offset their enhanced safety characteristics.

The U.S. Advanced Reactor Demonstration Program was expected to help license and build two prototype SMRs during the 2020s, with up to $4 billion of government funding.

Nuclear proliferation
Nuclear proliferation, or the use of nuclear materials to create weapons, is a concern for small modular reactors. As SMRs have lower generation capacity and are physically smaller, they are intended to be deployed in many more locations than conventional plants. SMRs are expected to substantially reduce staffing levels. The combination creates physical protection and security concerns.

Many SMRs are designed to address these concerns. Fuel can be low-enriched uranium, with less than 20% fissile . This low quantity, sub-weapons-grade uranium is less desirable for weapons production. Once the fuel has been irradiated, the mixture of fission products and fissile materials is highly radioactive and requires special handling, preventing casual theft.

Contrasting to conventional large reactors, SMRs can without difficulty be adapted to be installed in a sealed underground chamber; therefore, “reducing the vulnerability of the reactor to a terrorist attack or a natural disaster”. New SMR designs enhance the proliferation resistance, such as those from the reactor design company Gen4.These models of SMR offer a solution capable of operating sealed underground for the life of the reactor following installation.

Some SMR designs are designed for one-time fueling. This improves proliferation resistance by eliminating on-site nuclear fuel handling and means that the fuel can be sealed within the reactor. However, this design requires large amounts of fuel, which could make it a more attractive target. A 200 MWe 30-year core life light water SMR could contain about 2.5 tonnes of plutonium at end of life.

Furthermore, many SMRs offer the ability to go periods of greater than 10 years without requiring any form of refueling therefore improving the proliferation resistance as compared to conventional large reactors of which entail refueling every 18–24 months

Light-water reactors designed to run on thorium offer increased proliferation resistance compared to the conventional uranium cycle, though molten salt reactors have a substantial risk.

SMR are transported from the factories without fuel, as they are fueled on the ultimate site, except some microreactors.

List of reactor designs

Numerous reactor designs have been proposed. Notable SMR designs:

Proposed sites

Canada
In 2018, the Canadian province of New Brunswick announced it would invest $10 million for a demonstration project at the Point Lepreau Nuclear Generating Station. It was later announced that SMR proponents Advanced Reactor Concepts and Moltex would open offices there.

On 1 December 2019, the Premiers of Ontario, New Brunswick and Saskatchewan signed a memorandum of understanding  "committing to collaborate on the development and deployment of innovative, versatile and scalable nuclear reactors, known as Small Modular Reactors (SMRs)." They were joined by Alberta in August 2020. With continued support from citizens and government officials have led to the execution of a selected SMR at the Canadian National Nuclear Laboratory.

In 2021, Ontario Power Generation announced they plan to build a BWRX-300 SMR at their Darlington site to be completed by 2028. A licence for construction still had to be applied for.

On 11 August 2022, Invest Alberta, the Government of Alberta’s crown corporation signed a MOU with Terrestrial Energy regarding IMSR in Western Canada through an interprovincial MOU it joined earlier.

China
In July 2019, China National Nuclear Corporation announced it would build an ACP100 SMR on the north-west side of the existing Changjiang Nuclear Power Plant at Changjiang, in the Hainan province by the end of the year. On 7 June 2021, the demonstration project, named the Linglong One, was approved by China's National Development and Reform Commission. In July, China National Nuclear Corporation (CNNC) started the construction, and in October 2021, the containment vessel bottom of the first of two units was installed. Being the world's first commercial land-based SMR prototype, the commercial operation is due to start by the end of 2026.

Poland 
Polish chemical company Synthos declared plans to deploy a Hitachi BWRX-300 reactor (300 MW) in Poland by 2030. A feasibility study was completed in December 2020 and licensing started with the Polish National Atomic Energy Agency.

In February 2022, NuScale Power and the large mining conglomerate KGHM Polska Miedź announced signing of contract to construct first operational reactor in Poland by 2029.

United Kingdom
In 2016, it was reported that the UK Government was assessing Welsh SMR sites - including the former Trawsfynydd nuclear power station - and on the site of former nuclear or coal-fired power stations in Northern England. Existing nuclear sites including Bradwell, Hartlepool, Heysham, Oldbury, Sizewell, Sellafield, and Wylfa were stated to be possibilities. The target cost for a 470 MWe Rolls-Royce SMR unit is £1.8 billion for the fifth unit built. In 2020, it was reported that Rolls-Royce had plans to construct up to 16 SMRs in the UK. In 2019, the company received £18 million to begin designing the modular system. An additional £210 million was awarded to Rolls-Royce by the British government in 2021, complemented by a £195 million contribution from private firms. In November 2022 Rolls-Royce announced that the sites at Trawsfynydd, Wylfa, Sellafield and Oldbury would be prioritised for assessment as potential locations for multiple SMRs.

United States
In December 2019, the Tennessee Valley Authority was authorized to receive an Early Site Permit (ESP) by the Nuclear Regulatory Commission for siting an SMR at its Clinch River site in Tennessee. This ESP is valid for 20 years, and addresses site safety, environmental protection and emergency preparedness. This ESP is applicable for any light-water reactor SMR design under development in the United States.

The Utah Associated Municipal Power Systems (UAMPS) announced a partnership with Energy Northwest to explore siting a NuScale Power reactor in Idaho, possibly on the Department of Energy's Idaho National Laboratory.

The Galena Nuclear Power Plant in Galena, Alaska was a proposed micro nuclear reactor installation. It was a potential deployment for the Toshiba 4S reactor.

Romania 
On the occasion of 2021 United Nations Climate Change Conference, the state-owned Romanian nuclear energy company Nuclearelectrica and NuScale signed an agreement to build a power plant with six small-scale nuclear reactors on the site of a former coal power plant, located in the village of Doicești, Dâmbovița county, 90 km North of Bucharest. The project is estimated to be completed by 2026–2027, which will make the power plant the first of its kind in Europe. The power plant will generate 462 MWe, securing the consumption of about 46.000 households and will help avoid the release of 4 million tons of CO2 per year.

References

Further reading

External links

DOE Office of Nuclear Energy 
American Nuclear Regulatory Commission
World Nuclear Association
American Nuclear Society
International Atomic Energy Agency
Overview and Status of SMRs Being Developed in the United States

Nuclear power reactor types
Small modular reactor